Legat is a small town in southern Mauritania near the Senegal River.

Transport 

It is a station on a proposed railway to carry phosphate from mines near Kaedi.

See also 

 Transport in Mauritania

References 

Populated places in Mauritania